A Dangerous Age is a 1958 film directed by Sidney J. Furie.

Plot summary

Sidney J. Furie's low-budget tale about young lovers (Ben Piazza and Anne Pearson) on the run from an uncaring adult world – they just want to get married but are thwarted at every turn – remains something of landmark in English-Canadian feature production.

Reception

A Dangerous Age began as an hour-long drama for CBC-TV, where the 24-year-old Furie worked as a writer, and received critical praise when it was released in the UK where Furie was recognized as a fresh talent; however, it was ignored in Canada.

References

External links

1958 films
Films directed by Sidney J. Furie
1958 directorial debut films
Canadian drama films
English-language Canadian films
1950s English-language films
1950s Canadian films